The 1922 USC Trojans football team represented the University of Southern California (USC) in the 1922 college football season. In their fourth year under head coach Gus Henderson, the Trojans compiled a 10–1 record (3–1 against conference opponents), finished in fourth place in the Pacific Coast Conference, outscored their opponents by a combined total of 236 to 31, and defeated Penn State in the 1923 Rose Bowl.

Schedule

References

USC
USC Trojans football seasons
Rose Bowl champion seasons
USC Trojans football